Major-General Samuel Wilson was a career Bombay Army officer, and was commander in chief in Bombay in 1826. He retired in 1826 and went back to England after 46 years of service.

Footnotes

References

Year of birth missing
Year of death missing
Commanders-in-chief of Bombay
British East India Company Army generals